Çilligöl can refer to:

 Çilligöl, Çayırlı
 Çilligöl, Hınıs